Spotlight 2 is an Indian romantic web series which premiered on 26 January 2017 and streaming on Viu. The show stars Karan Grover and Aditi Arya. It is produced and written by Vikram Bhatt and director by Sidhant Sachdev. The web series is based on life of a young great successful rockstar. It draws narrative influence from the movie Aashiqui 2.

Plot 
The story revolves around an upcoming rock star and musician Vicky (Karan Grover) who gets downhearted after losing the ability to sing and his ex-girlfriend Jyotika (Aditi Arya) helps him to rebuild his life.

Cast 
 Karan Grover as Vicky
 Aditi Arya as Jyotika
 Ruhi Singh as Deeya Sarkar
 Mehul Dawar as Anubhav
Sayush Nayyar

References

External links
 Spotlight 2 streaming on Viu
 Spotlight 2 on IMDb

Hindi-language web series
YouTube original programming
Indian drama web series